The 2005 Tennessee Lady Volunteers softball team was an American softball team, representing the University of Tennessee for the 2005 NCAA softball season. The team played their home games at Tyson Park. The team made it to the 2005 Women's College World Series marking the first time that the team made it to the Women's College World Series.

Roster

Schedule 

|-
!colspan=9| UNLV Desert Classic

|-
!colspan=9| Georgia Southern Eagles Tourney

|-
!colspan=9| Palm Springs Classic

|-
!colspan=9| Charleston Southern Buccaneers Tourney

|-
!colspan=9|

|-
!colspan=9|SEC Tournament

|-
!colspan=9|NCAA Knoxville Regional

|-
!colspan=9|NCAA Stanford Super Regional

|-
!colspan=9|NCAA Women's College World Series

References 

Tennessee Volunteers softball seasons
Tennessee
Tennessee Volunteers softball season
Tennessee
Women's College World Series seasons